= Nor-Aparan =

- Location within Armenia
- Coordinates: 40°07′57″N 44°29′00″E
- Country: Armenia
- Marz (Province): Yerevan
- Time zone: UTC+4 ( )
  - Summer (DST): UTC+5 ( )

Nor-Aparan is a town in the Yerevan Province of Armenia.
